In Japanese mythology, the story of the  occurs after the creation of Japan (Kuniumi). It concerns the birth of the divine (kami) descendants of Izanagi and Izanami.

Story

According to the Kojiki, various gods were born from the relationship between Izanagi and Izanami until the fire deity, Kagu-tsuchi, at birth burned Izanami's genitals and wounded her fatally. Izanagi, witnessing the death of his beloved wife, in rage took the ten-grasp sabre and crushed his child, Kagutsuchi. A number of gods were born from the blood and remains of Kagutsuchi. Subsequently, Izanagi went to the land of Yomi (the world of the dead) to find Izanami, however when he found her, she had become a rotting corpse and from her parts other gods had arisen, causing the flight of Izanagi to the world of the living. Then Izanagi performed the misogi ritual purification through which more gods are born.  The last of these are the three most important gods of Shinto: Amaterasu, goddess of the sun; Tsukuyomi, deity of the moon; and Susano'o, god of the sea.

Birth of the gods
After having created the Eight Large Islands (Ōyashima) and other islands during the creation of Japan, Izanagi and Izanami decided to give birth to other gods, among them household deities, deities of the wind, trees and meadows, all born spontaneously:

  = Ōgoto-oshi'o, male deity
 , male deity
 , female deity
 , genderless deity and spirit
 , male deity
 , male deity
 , male deity
 , genderless deity and spirit
 , male deity
 , female deity
 From the relationship between Haya'akitsuhiko and Haya'akitsuhime the following gods were born:
 = Awa-nagi, male deity
  = Awa-nami, female deity
 , male deity
 , female deity
 , genderless deity and spirit
 , genderless deity and spirit
 , genderless deity and spirit
 , genderless deity and spirit
 , male deity
 , genderless deity and spirit
Ohoyama-tsumi/ Ōyama-tsumi (大山津見神, Ohoyama-tsumi/ Ōyama-tsumi -no-kami), male deity - [for his genealogy with Susano'o, please refer to Ōyamatsumi]
 From the relationship between Ohoyamatsumi and Kaya-no-hime the following gods were born:
, genderless deity and spirit
 , genderless deity and spirit
 , genderless deity and spirit
 , genderless deity and spirit
 , genderless deity and spirit
 , genderless deity and spirit
 , male deity
 , female deity
 , also known as  - genderless deity and spirit
 , female deity

During Kagutsuchi's birth, Izanami's genitals were burned and she was mortally wounded. In her agony, from her vomit, urine and feces more gods were born.
 , male deity born from the vomit and feces of Izanami
 , female deity born from the vomit and feces of Izanami
 , male deity born from the feces of Izanami
  , female deity born from the feces of Izanami
  = Mizuhanome, female deity born from the urine of Izanami
 , = Tori-no-wakumusubi, male deity born from the urine of Izanami

 Wakumusuhi had a daughter:
1. , female deity

Death of Kagutsuchi
After the agony, Izanami dies. At the time Izanagi crept moaning about the body and mourned her death. From his tears, the female deity  was born. Subsequently Izanagi buried Izanami on Mount Hiba. His sadness turned into anger and he decided to kill Kagutsuchi with a ten-grasp sword called Ame-no-ohabari/ (archaic name) Ame-no-wohabari .

From the blood of Kagutsuchi the following gods emerged:

 
 
 
 The gods above were born from the blood that fell from the tip of the sword in the rocks.
 
 
 The gods above were born from the blood that fell from the blade of the sword.
 
 
 The gods above were born from the blood that fell from the handle of the sword.

Also, from the body of Kagutsuchi the following gods were born:
 , emerged from Kagutsuchi's head;
 , from the chest;
 , from the abdomen;
 Kurayama-tsumi (Kojiki: 闇山津見神) or (Nihon Shiki: 闇山祇), from the genitals;
 , from the left arm;
 , from the right arm;
 , from the left foot;
 Toyama-tsumi (Kojiki: 戸山津見神) or (Nihon Shiki: 戸山祇), from the right foot.

Land of Yomi

Izanagi then decided to bring back Izanami and goes to Yomi-no-kuni, the underworld. Crossing the gates to that world, he met Izanami and says to her:

Izanami replied:

On saying this, Izanami entered the palace of these gods. However, time passed and she did not return and Izanagi began to despair. So he broke one of the tines of his ornamental comb mizura that he wore in the left bun of his hair, lit it in order to light the place and decided to enter the world of dead. He manages to find Izanami but is surprised to see that she lost her beauty and had become a rotting corpse, covered with maggots. Of her body were born the eight Gods of thunder, which were:

 , from the head of Izanami;
 , from her chest;
 , from her abdomen;
 , from her genitals;
 , from her left arm;
 , from her right arm;
 , from her left foot;
 , from her right foot.

In his flight, he took the head-dress from his head, and threw it to the ground where it turned into a bunch of grapes. The Yomotsushikome started to eat them but kept chasing the fleeing Izanagi. So he broke the tine of the comb that he wore in his right bun, and as he threw it to the ground it became bamboo shoots, prompting the Yomotsushikome to eat them and enabling Izanagi to flee.

However, Izanami decided to release the eight gods of thunder and 1,500 warriors from Yomi to continue the pursuit. Izanagi drew and brandished his Totsuka-no-Tsurugi sword to continue his flight. He took three peaches from a tree that had grown in that place and threw them at his pursuers so that they fled.

Izanagi commented:

These peaches were called .

Finally, Izanami persecuted Izanagi, but he lifted a rock that a thousand men could not move and blocked the slope with it. At that moment, their eyes met for the last time.

Izanami said:

Izanagi replied:

These words justified the circle of life and death in humans.

Purification of Izanagi

Leaving Yomi, Izanagi decided to remove all uncleanness in his body through a purification ceremony (misogi) consisting of a bath in the river at Ahakihara in Tachibana no Ono in Tsukushi. As he stripped his clothes and accessories on the floor the following twelve gods are born:

 Tsukitatsu funato  (衝立船戸神 – Post at the Road Bend) = Chimata no Kami, emerges from the staff.
 Michi no nagachiha (道之長乳歯神 – Long Winding Way Stones), from the obi.
 Tokihakashi (時量師神 – Time Keeper Loosed), from the handbag.
 Wazurai no ushi (和豆良比能宇斯能神 – Master Miasma), from cloths.
 Michi mata (道俣神 – Road Fork), from the hakama.
 Akigui no ushi (飽咋之宇斯能神 – Master Filled Full), from the crown corona.
 Oki zakaru  (奥疎神 – Beyond Offshore), from the armband of the left hand.
 Okitsu nagisa biko (奥津那芸佐毘古神 – Offshore Surf Lad), from the armband of the left hand.
 Okitsu kaibera (奥津甲斐弁羅神 – Offshore Tide Lad), from the armband of the left hand.
 He zakaru (辺疎神 – Beyond Shoreside), from the armband of the right hand.
 Hetsu nagisa biko  (辺津那芸佐毘古神 – Shoreside Surf Lad), from the armband of the right hand.
 Hetsu kaibera (辺津甲斐弁羅神 – Shoreside Tide Lad), from the armband of the right hand.

Subsequently Izanagi is stripped of impurities from the land of Yomi. In this moment two gods were born:
 
 , male deity
 , male deity

Then, shaking off the curse, three gods were born:

 , male deity
 , male deity
 , female deity

Then, when washing with water the lower parts of his body, two gods were born;

 , genderless deity and spirit
 , male deity

When washing the middle of his body, two more gods were born:

 , genderless deity and spirit
 , male deity

Finally, washing the upper part of his body, two more gods were born:

 , genderless deity and spirit
 , male deity

The trio of Sokotsu-watatsumi, Nakatsu-watatsumi and Uwatsu-watatsumi make up the group of deities called Sanjin Watatsumi, or the gods of water. The trio of Sokotsutsuno'o, Nakatsutsuno'o and Uhatsutsuno'o make up the Sumiyoshi Sanjin group of deities, gods of fishing and sea, to whom tribute is paid at Sumiyoshi Taisha.

In the last step of the purification ceremony, Izanagi washed his left eye from which the female deity
 was born; washed his right eye from which the genderless deity and spirit  was born; and when washing his nose from which the male deity  = commonly known as Susano'o was born.

With these three gods called , Izanagi ordered their investiture. Amaterasu received the mandate to govern Takamagahara and a necklace of jewels called  from Izanagi. Tsukuyomi is mandated to govern over the Dominion of the Night, and Takehaya-susano'o (建速須佐之男命) = Susano'o is to rule the seas.

Notes

References

Bibliography

Japanese mythology
Creation myths
Kojiki